Volley Hermaea is an Italian women's volleyball club based in Olbia and currently playing in the Serie A2.

Previous names
Due to sponsorship, the club have competed under the following names:
 Gruppo Sportivo Avis Olbia (1980–1983)
 Pallavolo Hermaea Olbia (1983–....)
 Volley Hermaea Olbia (....–2014)
 Entu Olbia (2014–2017)
 Golem Olbia (2017–present)

History
The club was established in 1980 and was originally named . The club arrived at Serie B2 (in 2007), Serie B1 (in 2012) and Serie A2 (in 2014).

Venue
Since 2013 the club plays its home matches at the Geopalace in Olbia. The venue has a 3,000 spectators capacity.

Team
Season 2017–2018, as of December 2017.

References

External links

 Official website 

Italian women's volleyball clubs
Volleyball clubs established in 1980
1980 establishments in Italy
Olbia
Sport in Sardinia